The Bangladesh men's national volleyball team is the national men's volleyball team of Bangladesh. It is governed by the Bangladesh Volleyball Federation (B.V.F.) and takes part in international volleyball competitions and friendly matches.

They rank 65th in the FIVB World Rankings (as of August 2020).

Tournament records

Asian Championship

Asian Games

AVC Cup

Current squad
The following is the Bangladeshi roster at the 2016 South Asian Games.
 Head coach:  Imdadul Haque
 Assistant coach:  Nazrul Islam
 Assistant coach:  Masud Hafiz

 Masud Hossain
 Horosit Biswas
 Sheikh Shihab Ahmed
 Monir Hossain
 Humayun Kabir
 Mohammad Saiduzzaman
 Shahjahan Ali
 Shohel Rana
 Sayed Al Zabir
 Kaiser Hamid
 Mohsinuddin
 Aslam Hossain
 Sona Miah
 Syed Atiqur Rahman
 Mahibul Rabbi

References

External links
 FIVB profile

National, Men's
Bangladesh
Volleyball
Men's sport in Bangladesh